Greatest of All Time  is a term used to describe something or someone who is considered the best in a certain category and frequently used in popular lists of superlatives. It is typically abbreviated as G.O.A.T. or GOAT.

Greatest of All Time may also refer to:

 100 Greatest of All Time, a sports television series of five one-hour episodes, produced and first aired by the Tennis Channel in March 2012
 G.O.A.T. (LL Cool J album), 2000
 G.O.A.T. (Diljit Dosanjh album), 2020

See also
 
 Goat (disambiguation)